Sir John Hall  (18 December 1824 – 25 June 1907) was a New Zealand politician who served as the 12th premier of New Zealand from 1879 to 1882. He was born in Kingston upon Hull, England, the third son of George Hall, a captain in the navy. At the age of ten he was sent to school in Switzerland and his education continued in Paris and Hamburg. After returning to England and being employed by the Post Office, at the age of 27 he decided to emigrate. He was also Mayor of Christchurch.

Migration to New Zealand
After reading a book on sheep farming, Hall emigrated to New Zealand, on the Samarang, arriving in Lyttelton on 31 July 1852. His brothers George and Thomas followed him to New Zealand soon after. He developed one of the first large scale sheep farming runs in Canterbury.

Political offices

 
 

 
 

In 1853, he was elected to the Canterbury Provincial Council. He would later rise through the ranks of magistrate, was the first town council Chairman in Christchurch (the forerunner to the position of mayor, 1862 and 1863), and Postmaster-General. In Parliament he represented the electorates of Christchurch Country 1855–60 (resigned in early 1860), Heathcote 1866–70 & 1871–72 (resigned), Selwyn 1879–83 (resigned) & 1887–90, and Ellesmere 1890–93 (retired).

In the 1865–66 election, he contested the Heathcote electorate against G. Buckley, and they received 338 and 239 votes, respectively.

Hall was a member of the Legislative Council from 1876 to 1879 before resigning, wishing to re-enter the lower house. Thinking his previous seat of Heathcote unsuitable for his candidacy he accepted the offer of the retiring Cecil Fitzroy to stand in his vacated seat of Selwyn and was elected for it unopposed at the 1879 general election. At the same election the opposition leader, William Fox, was defeated leading Fox to invite Hall to succeed him on 6 September. Hall accepted the leadership and at the first opposition caucus following the election he was confirmed as leader, being elected unanimously.

Premier of New Zealand
On 8 October 1879, he was appointed the Premier of New Zealand, where his ministry carried out reforms of the male suffrage (extending voting rights) and dealt with a conflict between settlers and Māori at Parihaka, although poor health caused him to resign the position less than three years later. In the 1882 Birthday Honours, he was appointed a Knight Commander of the Order of St Michael and St George.

Immigration

Although Chinese immigrants were invited to New Zealand by the Dunedin Chamber of Commerce, prejudice against them quickly led to calls for restrictions on immigration. Following the example of anti-Chinese poll taxes enacted by California in 1852 and by Australian states in the 1850s, 1860s and 1870s, John Hall's government passed the Chinese Immigration Act 1881. This imposed a £10 tax per Chinese person entering New Zealand, and permitted only one Chinese immigrant for every 10 tons of cargo. Richard Seddon's government increased the tax to £100 per head in 1896, and tightened the other restriction to only one Chinese immigrant for every 200 tons of cargo.

Women's suffrage
Hall took an active interest in women's rights. He moved the Parliamentary Bill that gave women in New Zealand the vote (1893), (the first country in the world to do so), he became the honorary Mayor of Christchurch, for the New Zealand International Exhibition from 1 November 1906 to 15 April 1907.

Despite the distances involved, Hall made several visits back to England and maintained his contacts there, especially with the Leathersellers' Company, of which he was a Liveryman for 55 years.

Hall had married Rose Dryden in England, daughter of William Dryden of Kingston upon Hull, after returning there in 1860. They went back to New Zealand in 1863. They had five children and one of their granddaughters, Mary Grigg, later became an MP for the National Party.

Hall died in Christchurch on 25 June 1907, shortly after the International Exhibition had finished. He is buried in the St. John cemetery in Hororata.

References

Sources

Further reading
 

|-

|-

|-

|-

|-

|-

|-

|-

Prime Ministers of New Zealand
Mayors of Christchurch
Politicians from Kingston upon Hull
1824 births
1907 deaths
Members of the New Zealand House of Representatives
Members of the Canterbury Provincial Council
English emigrants to New Zealand
Independent MPs of New Zealand
New Zealand MPs for South Island electorates
Members of the New Zealand Legislative Council
Members of Canterbury provincial executive councils
New Zealand Knights Commander of the Order of St Michael and St George
19th-century New Zealand politicians
Colonial Secretaries of New Zealand
New Zealand politicians awarded knighthoods
Lyttelton Harbour Board members
Sheriffs of New Zealand